Point is a French surname. Notable people with the surname include:

Brayden Point (born 1996), Canadian ice hockey player
Christophe Point (born 1965), French footballer
Colton Point (born 1998), Canadian ice hockey player
Craig Point (born 1986), Canadian lacrosse player
Mittie Frances Clarke Point (1850–1937), American writer
Steven Point (born 1951), Canadian judge
Susan Point (born 1952), Canadian artist

See also
Jason LaPoint (born 1977), American racing driver

French-language surnames